Pukara (Aymara and Quechua for fortress, also spelled Pucara) is a mountain in the Bolivian Andes which reaches a height of approximately . It is located in the Potosí Department, Antonio Quijarro Province, Porco Municipality. It lies east of the village of Challwiri (Challviri).

References 

Mountains of Potosí Department